Chitaraque is a town and municipality in the Ricaurte Province, part of the Colombian department of Boyacá. It borders Gámbita, Santander in the east and south, San José de Pare, Santana and Togüí in the west and Suaita, Santander in the north.

Etymology 
The name Chitaraque comes from Chibcha and means "Our vigorous farmfields from before".

History 
In the times before the Spanish conquest, Chitaraque was inhabited by the Poasaque tribe, belonging to the Muisca. It was ruled by the zaque of Hunza.

Modern Chitaraque was founded on January 1, 1621.

Economy 
Main economical activities of Chitaraque are agriculture (panela production, coffee, bananas and yuca) and milk farming.

References 

Municipalities of Boyacá Department
Populated places established in 1621
1621 establishments in the Spanish Empire
Muysccubun